Louis-Henry Lemirre (8 April 1929 – 1 August 2000) was a French archer. He competed in the men's individual event at the 1972 Summer Olympics.

References

External links
 

1929 births
2000 deaths
French male archers
Olympic archers of France
Archers at the 1972 Summer Olympics
People from Vire
Sportspeople from Calvados (department)